Jarocho in Mexican Spanish is a colloquial demonym for residents of the State of Veracruz, Mexico, as well as an appellative term for anything related to said state.

Etymology 
One explanation of the origin of the term jarocho is that it evolved from an old Spanish word meaning brusque or disordered. Or the long spear used by fishermen in the coastal Papaloapan River. It has also been theorized that is from the Totonac word Jolocho.

Usage 
Traditionally, the term is applied to all people from the state of Veracruz. In strict way, it should be limited to the southern coastal regions of the state, more particularly, to farmers and fishers living along the valley of the Papaloapan river, specially those in or near the towns of Cosamaloapan, Tlacotalpan, and Alvarado.

Musical groups of jarochos are bands of minstrel musicians, who dress and play in the Veracruz style. They are distinguished by their traditional white guayabera shirts and white pants and hats; also the men wear a red bandana around their neck. Music played by jarochos is known as Son Jarocho.

See also 
 Mexican Spanish
 Son jarocho

References

 
Mexican styles of music
Veracruz
Mexican culture
Demonyms